The Pohnpei fantail (Rhipidura kubaryi) is a fantail, known as Likepsir in Pohnpeian, which is endemic to the Pacific island of Pohnpei in the Federated States of Micronesia. It is a bird commonly found in forests and at forest edges. It feeds on insects which it gathers by gleaning amongst foliage or by making short dashes while in the air.

It is a small bird (15 cm) with a long, fan-shaped tail which is often fanned or wagged. The plumage is mostly dark grey with a white eyebrow, moustache and tips to the tail feathers. The belly is white and the breast is blackish with white feather edges giving a scaly appearance.

The species is closely related to the rufous fantail (Rhipidura rufifrons) but it is darker and duller in appearance with a different song and feeding behaviour.

The scientific name commemorates the Polish naturalist Jan Kubary.

References

 H. Douglas Pratt, Philip L. Bruner & Delwyn G. Berrett (1987), A Field Guide to the Birds of Hawaii and the Tropical Pacific, Princeton University Press.

External links
 Stamp showing the Pohnpei fantail

Rhipidura
Pohnpei
Birds described in 1876
Taxa named by Otto Finsch